Plantago robusta, commonly known as the St Helena plantain, is a flowering plant in the family Plantaginaceae. It is endemic to St. Helena. 

It is classified as critically endangered by the International Union for Conservation of Nature.

Distribution 
It is found in St. Helena.

Taxonomy 
It was described by A.Beatson, in Tracts St. Helena: 317 in 1816.

References

External links 

robusta

Flora of Saint Helena